Shang Yin (born 23 January 1989) is a Chinese footballer currently playing as a midfielder or forward for Dalian Professional.

Club career
Shang Yin would play for the Shanghai United youth team until the club merged with local rivals Shanghai Shenhua. He would be released due to the enlarged squad size and opened a crayfish shop and a barbecue stall while playing for ametur club Shanghai Moshidi Aibi Football Club (DIB), which is the abbreviation of "Do it better"). One day his club was invited to provide competition for the reserve team of Shanghai Shenhua, where he impressed the club and after being given a trial was offered a professional contract with his boyhood supported club.

Shang would be loaned out to third tier club Jiangxi Beidamen throughout the 2013 China League Two season. On his return to Shenhua he could not break into the senior team and was allowed to leave once his contract ended. He would return to ametur football by joining fourth tier football club  Hainan Seamen and helped them come runners-up within the division and promotion to the professional leagues at the end of the 2015 league season. Despite this promotion he returned to Shanghai to join another fourth tier club in Shanghai Sunfun and once again he was able to help his new team gain promotion. This time he remained with the club as the participated within the 2017 China League Two campaign. 

On 9 March 2018 he joined another third tier club in Sichuan Longfor before the start of the 2018 China League Two season. He would go on to establish himself as an integral member of the team and helped them win the division title and promotion without losing a single game. The following campaign he would guide the club to finish above the relegation zone, however the club was dissolved after they failed to submit the salary & bonus confirmation form before the 2020 season. On 4 June 2020, he joined second tier Jiangxi Beidamen before the start of the 2020 China League One season. His debut would be a league game on 13 September 2020 against Shaanxi Chang'an Athletic F.C. in a 1-1 draw. Throughout the season he would go on to be vital member of the team and the clubs top goal scorer with seven goals at the end of the season. 

On 21 April 2022 he joined top tier club Dalian Professional for the start of the 2022 Chinese Super League season. He would make his top tier league debut on 8 June 2022, aged 33 against Guangzhou City in a game that was initially won by a score of 2-0 but was overturned to a 3-0 defeat after Dalian fielded an ineligible Under 23 years of age player. Despite this disappointment he would still go to establish himself as a vital member of the team and score his first goal for the club in a league game on 12 June 2022 against Changchun Yatai F.C. in a 1-1 draw.

Career statistics
.

Notes

References

1989 births
Living people
Chinese footballers
Association football midfielders
China League Two players
China League One players
Shanghai Shenhua F.C. players
Jiangxi Beidamen F.C. players
Shanghai Sunfun F.C. players
Sichuan Longfor F.C. players